Francisco da Silva Marques (born 11 March 1905, date of death unknown) was a Portuguese footballer who played as forward.

Football career 

Silva Marques gained 3 caps for Portugal and made his debut against France in Lisbon 16 March 1927, in a 4-0 win.

External links 
 
 

1905 births
Portuguese footballers
Association football forwards
Primeira Liga players
C.F. Os Belenenses players
Portugal international footballers
Year of death missing